Gary Brightwell Jr. (born February 28, 1999) is an American football running back for the New York Giants of the National Football League (NFL). He played college football at Arizona.

High school
Gary graduated in 2017 from St. Frances Academy in Baltimore. His senior season he served as team captain and was First-team all-conference and first-team All-State MIAA. He averaged 6.7 yards per carry as a senior rushing for 519 yards and eight touchdowns on 78 carries.

Professional career

2021

Brightwell was drafted by the New York Giants in the sixth round, 196th overall, of the 2021 NFL Draft. On May 13, 2021, Brightwell officially signed with the Giants. On December 30, 2021, Brightwell was placed on Injured reserve after suffering a neck injury.

2022
Brightwell had his first career rushing touchdown in Week 5 against the Green Bay Packers in the 27-22 victory.

Personal life
Brightwell's father was murdered at a gas station when Brightwell was five months old, his older sister was killed in a car crash when he was a senior in high school and his grandmother who taught him how to play football died just weeks before the NFL draft.

References

External links 
Arizona bio

Living people
New York Giants players
Players of American football from Pennsylvania
Sportspeople from Chester, Pennsylvania
American football running backs
Arizona Wildcats football players
1999 births